Lauren Gunderson (born February 5, 1982) is an American playwright, screenwriter, and short story author, born in Atlanta. She  lives in San Francisco, where she teaches playwriting. Gunderson was recognized by American Theatre magazine as America's most produced living playwright at Theatre Communications Group (TCG, the magazine's publisher) member theaters in 2017, and again in 2019–20.

Life
Gunderson earned her Bachelor of Arts in Creative Writing from Emory University in 2004, and her Master of Fine Arts in Dramatic Writing from New York University's Tisch School of the Arts in 2009, where she was also a Reynolds Fellow in Social Entrepreneurship.

She is married to virologist Nathan Wolfe and has 2 sons.

Career 
Lauren Gunderson's works heavily focus on female figures in history, science, and literature. She is one of the top 20 most-produced playwrights in the country, and has been America's most produced living playwright since 2016. She has had over twenty plays produced including, I and You, Émilie: La Marquise Du Châtelet Defends Her Life Tonight, Parts They Call Deep, and Background.

I and You 
I and You was the winner of the 2014 Harold and Mimi Steinberg/American Theatre Critics Association New Play Award, and a finalist for the 2014 Susan Smith Blackburn Prize. I and You was produced at Hampstead Theatre in 2018 and starred Game of Thrones actress Maisie Williams. Gunderson was awarded the Lanford Wilson award from Dramatists Play Service in 2016.

Émilie: La Marquise Du Châtelet Defends Her Life Tonight 
Émilie: La Marquise Du Châtelet Defends Her Life Tonight, about the real-life 18th-century physicist Émilie du Châtelet, was commissioned and developed at South Coast Repertory as part of their 2008 Pacific Playwrights Festival directed by Kate Whorisky. It was produced the following year directed by David Emmes. On 25 January 2011, it opened in West Seattle, at Arts West Theater. It is published by Samuel French, Inc. (2010). Émilie received its European and British premiere in Oxford, UK during February 2014.

Parts They Call Deep and Background 
Parts They Call Deep won the 2002 Young Playwrights National Playwriting Competition and was produced Off-Broadway by Young Playwrights Inc. as part of the young Playwrights Festival at the Cherry Lane Theater. "Parts They Call Deep" and Background won her the Essential Theatre Prize in 2000 and 2004. Background, about physicist Ralph Alpher, was published by Isotope: A Literary Journal of Nature and Science Writing (2009, issue 7.2).

We Won't Sleep (formerly Jeannette) 
Gunderson wrote the book to the musical, "We Won't Sleep, about U.S. Rep. Jeannette Rankin, the first woman elected to Congress. The music and lyrics were written by Arianna Afsar. Under the title Jeannette, it was part of the 2019 summer series at the National Music Theater Conference at the Eugene O'Neill Theater Center in Connecticut. We Won't Sleep is scheduled to have its world premiere at the Tony Award-winning Signature Theatre in Arlington, Virginia in 2022. Activism 
Gunderson has made some of her plays available for activist purposes, and is touted as an Arts meets Activism writer.

 The Taming The Taming is an all-female political farce which premiered at Crowded Fire Theater Company in 2013.  Inspired by Shakespeare's The Taming of the Shrew, The Taming explores what happens when a beauty queen with a constitutional law degree, a Republican senator's aide, and a liberal online influencer are all locked in a hotel together, trying to make a better America. Gunderson made this play free to produce on the night of the 2017 presidential inauguration of Donald Trump, citing her belief that theater, art, and stories have the ability to make lasting change.

 Natural Shocks 
In April 2018, Gunderson created a national campaign of theater activism with royalty-free readings of her play Natural Shocks to address domestic violence and gun violence against women. Theaters across the U.S. participated in these readings including, The Know Theatre and Cincinnati Shakespeare Company.

In both instances, Gunderson stipulated that all proceeds from the productions be given to charitable causes.

Works

 2001 Parts They Call Deep 2004 Leap 2005 Background 2005 Eye Of The Beheld 2010 Emilie: La Marquise Du Châtelet Defends Her Life Tonight 2011 The Amazing Adventures Of Dr. Wonderful And Her Dog! 2011 Rock Creek: Southern Gothic 2012 Exit, Pursued By A Bear 2012 We Are Denmark 2013 By And By 2013 Toil & Trouble 2014 I And You 2014 Fire Work 2015 Ada And The Memory Engine 2015 Bauer 2015 Silent Sky 2015 The Taming 2017 The Book Of Will 2017 Miss Bennet: Christmas at Pemberley 2017 The Revolutionists 2018 Natural Shocks 2019 Jeannette (Musical)
 2019 The Half-Life of Marie Curie 2021 The Catastrophist''

References

External links

Profile

1982 births
Living people
21st-century American dramatists and playwrights
American women dramatists and playwrights
Emory University alumni
Tisch School of the Arts alumni
Writers from Atlanta
Writers from San Francisco
21st-century American women writers